Marlene Dobkin de Rios  (April 12, 1939 – November 10, 2012) was an American cultural anthropologist, medical anthropologist, and psychotherapist. She conducted fieldwork in the Amazon for almost 30 years. Her research included the use of entheogenic plants by the indigenous peoples of Peru.

Early life and education 
Dobkin de Rios completed a bachelor's degree in clinical psychology at Queens College, City University of New York in 1959. In 1963, Dobkin de Rios earned a M.A. in anthropology from New York University. She researched gender issues including the social aspects of purdah in Turkey and the French colonial empire's policies impacting women in French West Africa.

She conducted doctoral research on the Preclassic Maya's use of psychoactive plants. In 1972, she earned a Ph.D. at University of California, Riverside. Her dissertation was titled The Use of Hallucinogenic Substances in Peruvian Amazonian Folk Healing.

Career 
In 1972, Dobkin de Rios became a tenured professor cultural anthropology at California State University, Fullerton. She taught at Fullerton from 1969 until her retirement in 2000. Dobkin de Rios led fieldwork in the Peruvian and Brazilian Amazon for almost thirty years. Her research included the use of entheogenic plants by the indigenous peoples of Peru.

From 1999 to 2000, Dobkin de Rios directed the qualitative dimension of research of ayahuasca use among adolescents within the União do Vegetal in Brazil.

Dobkin de Rios was a fellow of the American Anthropological Association and the Royal Anthropological Institute of Great Britain and Ireland.

Personal life 
Dobkin de Rios was born to Anne (née Schwartz), a bookkeeper, and Bernard Dobkin, a salesman, on April 12, 1939, in New York City. Her family were Russian Jews.

On November 7, 1969, Dobkin de Rios married artist Yando Rios, son of Peruvian healer Don Hilde. They had two children. Dobkin de Rios died on November 10, 2012, in Placentia, California of cancer.

Selected works

References

External links
 

1939 births
2012 deaths
American women anthropologists
Cultural anthropologists
Medical anthropologists
American psychotherapists
Queens College, City University of New York alumni
New York University alumni
California State University, Fullerton faculty
University of California, Riverside alumni
Deaths from cancer in California
American people of Russian-Jewish descent
Jewish anthropologists
20th-century American Jews
20th-century American women writers
21st-century American women writers
Fellows of the Royal Anthropological Institute of Great Britain and Ireland
Academics from New York (state)
Writers from New York City
21st-century American Jews